The Hind class was a class of four sloops of wooden construction built for the Royal Navy between 1743 and 1746. Two were built by contract with commercial builders to a common design prepared by Sir Joseph Allin, Surveyor to the Navy and former Master Shipwright at Deptford Dockyard, and the other two were built in Deptford Dockyard itself.

The first two - Hind and Vulture - were ordered on 6 August 1743 to be built to replace two ex-Spanish vessels (the Rupert's Prize and Pembroke's Prize, captured in 1741 and 1742 respectively, and put into service by the British). Although initially armed with ten 6-pounder guns, this class was built with seven pairs of gunports on the upper deck, enabling them to be re-armed with fourteen 6-pounders later in their careers.

Two more vessels to the same design - Jamaica and Trial - were ordered ten days later, on 18 August 1743; these were built under Allin's supervision at Deptford Dockyard, and were the only wartime sloops of this era be built in a Royal Dockyard.

Vessels

References 

McLaughlan, Ian. The Sloop of War 1650-1763. Seaforth Publishing, 2014. .
Winfield, Rif. British Warships in the Age of Sail 1714-1792: Design, Construction, Careers and Fates. Seaforth Publishing, 2007. .

Sloop classes